Caen, Gare de l'Ouest or Gare Calvados, is the main and now only station serving the city of Caen, Normandy, France. The station stands on the main line from Paris to Cherbourg and although it mainly is an intercity station many regional trains use the station. Typical services link Caen to Lisieux, Paris, Rouen, Saint-Lô, Granville, Bayeux and Cherbourg. The station opened in 1857 with the arrival of the CF de l'Ouest line from Paris. The station was rebuilt by Henri Pacon in 1934.

Services
The following services call at Caen :
Local services (TER Normandie) Cherbourg – Caen – Lisieux
Local services (TER Normandie) Caen – Alençon – Le Mans
Local services (TER Normandie) Caen – Lisieux – Bernay – Rouen
Local services (TER Normandie) Caen – Lison – Saint-Lô – Avranches – Rennes

See also
Caen Saint-Martin station (Caen à la Mer)
Caen Saint-Pierre station (CF du Calvados)

References

External links

 

Buildings and structures in Caen
Railway stations in Calvados
Railway stations in France opened in 1857